The train station Diebsteich is served by the rapid transit trains of the Hamburg S-Bahn and the commuter trains of the AKN railways plc. The S-Bahn tracks run parallel with the Hamburg-Altona–Kiel railway. Right along the tracks is the border of  the quarter Altona-Nord and Bahrenfeld of the Altona borough in Hamburg, Germany.

The station is named after a small lake in the neighbourhood which no longer exists.

Future

According to the German newspapers Hamburger Morgenpost and Die Welt in September 2009, the Deutsche Bahn AG plans to close the long distance train station at Altona and to build a new station at the area of Diebsteich station.

The station will be rebuilt and renamed Hamburg Altona, replacing the current Hamburg Altona station, which will be withdrawn from service after completion of the works, allowing terminating trains to proceed to the stabling facilities in Langenfelde without turning around, as well as services travelling onward to Kiel to serve the station without turning around.

Station layout
The station is elevated with an island platform, two tracks and only one exit. The station is in the fare zone 101.

Station services
The rapid transit trains of the lines S3 and S21 of the Hamburg S-Bahn stop at the station. The commuter trains of the line A1 stop at Diebsteich station only during the rush hours.

On track 1 the train destinations are Pinneberg (S3), Elbgaustraße railway station (S21) and Kaltenkirchen (A1). On track 2 the destination of A1 and S21 is via Holstenstraße toward Hamburg central station (A1) and Aumühle (S21). The S21 takes 10 minutes and the A1 only 9 minutes to reach Hamburg central station. The trains of the line S3 continue via Hamburg-Altona and Jungfernstieg railway station toward Stade and reach Hamburg central station in 18 minutes.

Facilities at the station
A small shop in the station sells fast food and newspapers. There are no lockerboxes and the station is not fully accessible for handicapped persons, because there is no lift. No personnel are attending the station, but there are SOS and information telephones and ticket machines. Bicycles can be locked in a previous rented boxes and also locked at stands free of charge.

See also

Hamburger Verkehrsverbund HVV

References

External links

DB station information 
 Line and route network plans at hvv.de 

Hamburg S-Bahn stations in Hamburg
Buildings and structures in Altona, Hamburg
Railway stations in Germany opened in 1962
1962 establishments in West Germany